The SNCF X 52100 class are diesel railcars that operated on the alpine lines from Grenoble, France from 1945 until 1973. 
They were capable of multiple unit operation with other car types, requiring an operator in each car; the lead conductor giving acceleration or deceleration orders using an audible tone. 

These were the first diesel-electric railcars used by the SNCF

Routes Served
The X 52100 units were used on the mountain lines out of Grenoble.

Preserved Units 
Only one example of the class remains :
 X 52103: Cité du Train, in operating condition.  Saved by the SNCF, it was restored by the Oullins-Voitures workshop in 1976 and donated to Cité du Train in 1988.

References 

52100
Diesel multiple units of France